Smooth Island is the northeasternmost of the Forge Islands, Argentine Islands, in the Wilhelm Archipelago. The name, given by the United Kingdom Antarctic Place-Names Committee (UK-APC) in 1961, is descriptive of the smooth, ice-free surface of this island, which is a useful navigational mark for vessels approaching Bloor Passage from the north.

See also 
 List of Antarctic and sub-Antarctic islands
 Drum Rock

Islands of the Wilhelm Archipelago